Mohammed Ali Al-Sharif (born 15 March 1983) is a Libyan futsal goalkeeper.

Al-Sharif played for the Libya national futsal team at the 2008 FIFA Futsal World Cup.

Honors

National Team 
 African Futsal Championship:
 2008
 Arab Futsal Championship:
 2007, 2008

Individual 
 Mediterranean Futsal Cup:
 Best Goalkeeper: 2010
 African Futsal Championship:
 Best Goalkeeper: 2008
 Arab Futsal Championship:
 Best Goalkeeper: 2007, 2008
 Algarve International Futsal Tournament:
 Best Goalkeeper: 2008

References

1983 births
Living people
Futsal goalkeepers
Libyan men's futsal players